Mordella invisitata is a species of beetle in the genus Mordella of the family Mordellidae, which is part of the superfamily Tenebrionoidea. It was discovered 
in 1945 by Liljeblad in Florida.

References

Beetles described in 1945
invisitata